The Carracci were a Bolognese family of artists that played an instrumental role in bringing forth the Baroque style in painting. Brothers Annibale (1560–1609) and Agostino (1557–1602) along with their cousin Ludovico (1555–1619) worked collaboratively. The Carracci family left their legacy in art theory by starting a school for artists in 1582. The school was called the Accademia degli Incamminati, and its main focus was to oppose and challenge Mannerist artistic practices and principles in order to create a renewed art of naturalism and expressive persuasion.

Art theory
The artistic and theoretical activity of the Carracci is recognized by critics and historians such as André Chastel and Giulio Carlo Argan to have decisively contributed to the formation of the figurative Baroque and to new pictorial solutions based on the recuperation of the classical and Renaissance tradition, renewed by study of nature. "Jointly they effected an artistic reform that overthrew Mannerist aesthetics and initiated the Baroque."

The crisis of the culture of Catholicism was highlighted after the Protestant Reform (in 1517 Martin Luther expounded his 95 theses in Wittenberg), and the successive "sack of Rome" by the troops of Charles V in 1527, facts that rendered the papal capital more insecure and unstable, and less attractive to the artists of the Roman epoch who at the end of the 16th century were less inclined to produce a new artistic movement.

The mannerist art that wearily replicated the style of the masters of the Renaissance, emphasizing formal complications and virtuosity, no longer obeyed the need for clarity and devotion.
Bologna was at the center of a territory in which the work of the artists traditionally had a pronounced devotional and pietistic character, and was influenced by north Italian and Venetian art.  On these cultural and aesthetic bases the Carracci developed their work as theorists of artistic renewal, emphasizing the humanity of subjects and the clarity of the sacred scenes.

The eclecticism of their art, the respect for tradition and a language adapted to the public places frequented by the working classes satisfied the desires of the church of the Counter-Reformation that needed a new mode to express its primacy over the other religions and confirm that art could and had to be a vehicle towards faith.

The Carracci fit perfectly into the political and artistic moment of the epoch—they recognized the need for an artistic style that could reflect the new desires and that was free from the artifice and complexity of Mannerism.

Another principle of the Carracci doctrine was the devotional aspect, the respect of the orthodoxy of the represented history. The Carracci followed the instructions contained in the work of the theorists of the time such as the Cardinal Gabriele Paleotti, author in 1582 of De sacris et profanis imaginibus  ("on sacred and profane images") which advocated for the control on the part of the ecclesiastic authority of the contents of the sacred scenes (the saints and their attributes had to be easily recognizable and respectful of the traditional, additionally the stories had to demonstrate fidelity towards the sacred texts), while the artists retained the "liberty" to choose the most suitable style.

Another point of reference was the work of Giovanni Andrea Gilio, author of Due Dialoghi...degli errori dei pittori ("two dialogues...on the errors of painters") in 1564 in which he criticized the excesses of refinement, of allegories and the bizarre inventions of the Mannerist art. The stories and the characters rendered lifelike in imitation of nature had to then be ennobled by the exercise of the art and refined on the example of the great masters of the past such as Raphael and Michelangelo, but also Titian, Veronese, Tintoretto, Correggio, and Parmigianino.

Agostino was also an important printmaker, reproducing the works of masters from the 16th century (mainly Correggio and Veronese) as examples to imitate for the numerous students of their school.  Annibale was the most talented and the one who, following his trip to Rome in 1595 where the works would be exhibited until his death in 1609, exercised a decisive influence on the fate of Italian painting at the dawn of the 17th century.

Accademia degli Incamminati

Driven by the desire to explore and share their new-found approach to painting, the Carracci family collectively founded a school of art in Bologna around 1582. Initially named Accademia dei Desiderosi ("Academy of the Desirous"), the school most likely began as an informal gathering of young artists in Ludovico Carracci's studio. Around 1590, the academy was renamed Accademia degli Incamminati ("Academy of Those who are Making Progress" or "Academy of the Journeying"), and adopted a more didactic academic programme. 
 
There is some debate regarding the school's organization and academic structure. However, it is likely that the academy functioned as a combination of a painters' workshop and a formal institution, and was attended by both students and established artists alike. 
 
Each member of the Carracci family made a unique contribution to the academy. It is believed that Ludovico Carracci occupied an administrative position, while Agostino was responsible for gathering new information, and Annibale for providing creativity, inspiration, and lessons on painting technique. Ludovico assembled and consolidated new materials to use as teaching aids, including a collection of plaster casts of classical works. Agostino brought to the school a wealth of knowledge in a variety of subjects, including art, music, philosophy, math, astronomy, geography, cartography, anthropology, and natural history. He used his knowledge of anatomy to construct detailed drawings of the human form, and provided books and medals from his own collection for the benefit of the students. Annibale, the most experienced artist of the group, shared his knowledge of painting via collaborative works with his pupils. 
 
The Carracci intended to provide the educated next generation of artists with an education that was valid both from a practical and theoretical point of view. The students were trained in a number of subjects to establish an intellectual background from which they could develop their artistic skill. Great emphasis was placed on the study of nature, and students were encouraged to practice drawing from life. The Carracci led their pupils in the study of experimental drawing, caricature, landscape painting, imitation, anatomy, perspective, and artistic theory. Students were also taught history, fables, and poetic inventions from which to draw inspiration. 
 
Notable students of the Carracci Academy include Francesco Albani, Guido Reni, Domenico Zampieri (Domenichino), Giovanni Lanfranco, Antonio Carracci, and Sisto Badalocchio. 
 
The opening of the Accademia degli Incamminati brought the Carracci name to great repute and attracted numerous commissions. These projects were typically allocated among the family by Ludovico or completed jointly by the three Carracci.

Collective works

There is much speculation and debate among art historians about which of the Carracci family members designed and executed various aspects of the frescoes that they painted.  Extant preparatory sketches for the frescoes indicate that for each artwork, the preliminary sketches were likely created by all of the Carracci collaboratively.  Likewise the finished frescoes would have been painted by all three of the Carracci but "despite much debate, there is no consensus among scholars as to the attribution of several scenes". "When asked who had done each scene, the Carracci, having freely traded ideas and sketches, and having worked elbow to elbow, are claimed to have responded, 'it is by the Carracci, we did it together.'  Such intimate collaboration, in which the individual style was sublimated in favor of a seamless, lively, and highly illusionistic effect, is characteristic of the Carracci's early period".

From 1583 to 1594, Annibale, Agostino, and Ludovico worked collaboratively to paint frescos on ceilings and walls of palaces in Bologna and Ferrara. One of their first joint commissions was the Palazzo Fava in Bologna. Here the Carracci painted frescoes of the Stories of Europa (1583–84), Stories of Jason (1583–84), and Stories of Aeneas (1586). The Carracci family's masterpiece, Stories of the Founding of Rome, was completed circa 1589–90, and is located in the main salon at the Palazzo Magnani-Salem in Bologna. In 1592, the Carracci went to Ferrara to decorate the ceiling of Palazzo dei Diamanti with scenes of the "Gods of Olympus." The following years, 1593–94, the Carracci were commissioned to paint frescoes of New Testament scenes and figures in three rooms of the Palazzo Sampieri-Talon in Bologna.

The popularity of the Carracci's frescoes at these Italian palaces (particularly the paintings at the Palazzo Magnani) caught the attention of another noble family, the Farnese.  The Duke of Parma and Piacenza, Ranuccio VI, and his brother, Cardinal Odoardo approached the Carracci in 1593 and asked them to come to Rome to decorate the Palazzo Farnese. In 1594 Annibale and Agostino went to Rome while Ludovico stayed in Bologna. "This summons signaled the end of the joint Carracci studio".

Works
Head of a Faun in a Concave (drawing in roundel, c. 1595, National Gallery of Art, Washington DC)
The Penitent Magdalen (private collection)
The Annunciation, Musée du Louvre, Paris
The Lamentation, Hermitage, St. Petersburg
Reciprico Amore, Baltimore Museum of Art
Carracci's erotic work

See also

Antonio Marziale Carracci

References

Further reading
General Texts

C.C. Malvasia, Felsina Pittrice. Vite de' pittori bolognesi divise in due tomi Roma, 1678
 
Denis Mahon, Studies in seicento art and theory London, 1947
Mostra dei Carracci: disegni catalogo critico a cura di Dennis Mahon, Bologna 1956
Maestri della pittura del Seicento emiliano catalogo della mostra a cura di Giulio Carlo Cavalli, Francesco Arcangeli, Andrea Emiliani, Maurizio Calvesi e Carlo Volpe, Bologna 1959
The Carracci: drawings and paintings catalogo della mostra a cura di Ralph Holland, 1961
Donald Posner, The Roman style of Annibale Carracci and his school, New York 1962
Le incisioni dei Carracci catalogo della mostra a cura di Maurizio Calvesi e Vittorio Casale, Roma 1965
Le arti di Bologna di Annibale Carracci a cura di Alessandro Marabottini, Roma 1966
Anna Ottani Cavina, Gli affreschi dei Carracci in Palazzo Fava, Bologna 1966
Carlo Volpe, Il fregio dei Carracci e i dipinti di Palazzo Magnani in Bologna, Bologna 1972
Anton W.A. Boschloo, Annibale Carracci in Bologna: visible reality in art after the Council of Trent, 's-Gravenhage 1974
Pittori bolognesi del Seicento nelle Gallerie di Firenze, catalogo della mostra a cura di Evelina Borea, Firenze 1975
L'opera completa di Annibale Carracci a cura di Gianfranco Malafarina, Milano 1976
Charles Dempsey, Annibale Carracci and the beginnings of baroque style, Glückstad 1977
Diane De Grazia, Prints and related drawings by the Carracci family: a catalogue raisonné, Bloomington 1979
Le Palais Farnèse, Roma 1980
Bologna 1584: gli esordi dei Carracci e gli affreschi di Palazzo Fava, catalogo della mostra, Bologna 1984
Gail Feigenbaum, Lodovico Carracci: a study of his later career and a catalogue of his paintings, Princeton 1984
Sydney J. Freedberg, Circa 1600: Annibale Carracci, Caravaggio, Ludovico Carracci: una rivoluzione stilistica nella pittura italiana, Bologna 1984
Cesare Gnudi, L'ideale classico: saggi sulla tradizione classica nella pittura del Cinquecento e del Seicento, Bologna 1984
Annibale Carracci e i suoi incisori, catalogo della mostra, Roma 1986
Nell'età di Correggio e dei Carracci, catalogo mostra, Bologna, 1986
Gli amori degli dei: nuove indagini sulla Galleria Farnese, a cura di Giuliano Briganti, André Chastel e Roberto Zapperi. Roma 1987
Dall'avanguardia dei Carracci al secolo barocco: Bologna 1580 – 1600 catalogo della mostra a cura di Andrea Emiliani, Bologna, 1988
Les Carrache et les decors profanes, Atti del colloquio (Roma, 2–4 ottobre 1986), Roma 1988
Roberto Zapperi, Annibale Carracci, Torino, 1988
Gli scritti dei Carracci: Ludovico, Annibale, Agostino, Antonio, Giovanni Antonio a cura di Giovanna Perini, Bologna 1990
Ludovico Carracci, catalogo della mostra a cura di Andrea Emiliani, Bologna 1993
Rudolf Wittkower, Arte e architettura in Italia 1600–1750, Torino, 1993
Emilio Negro e Massimo Pirondini, La scuola dei Carracci: dall'Accademia alla bottega di Ludovico, Modena 1994
Il chiostro dei Carracci a San Michele in Bosco a cura di Maria Silvia Campanini, Bologna 1994
Silvia Ginzburg Carignani, Annibale Carracci a Roma: gli affreschi di Palazzo Farnese, Roma 2000
Claudio Strinati, Annibale Carracci, Roma, 2001
Alessandro Brogi, Ludovico Carracci (1555–1619), Ozzano Emilia 2001
Annibale Carracci catalogo della mostra a cura di Daniele Benati e Eugenio Riccòmini, Milano 2006

Articles, Essays, and Contributions

Alfredo Petrucci, L'incisione carraccesca in "Bollettino d'arte" n. 35, pp. 131–144, 1950
Lionello Venturi, L'"eclettismo" e i Carracci: un post-scriptum in "Commentari" n.3, pp. 163–171, 1950
Francesco Arcangeli, Sugli inizi dei Carracci in "Paragone" n.79, pp. 17–48, 1956
Maurizio Calvesi, Note ai Carracci in "Commentari" n. 7, pp. 263–276, 1956
Augusta Ghidiglia Quintavalle, I Carracci e Parma in "Aurea Parma" n. 4, pp. 284–288, 1956
Roberto Longhi, Annibale, 1584? in "Paragone" n.89, pp. 33–42, 1957
Alessandro Del Vita, L'animosità di Agostino Carracci contro il Vasari in "Il Vasari" pp. 64–78, 1958
Stephen E. Ostrow, Note sugli affreschi con "Storie di Giasone" in Palazzo Fava in "Arte antica e moderna" n. 9, pp. 68–75, 1960
A. Richard Turner, The Genesis of a Carracci Landscape in "The Art quarterly" n. 3, pp. 249–258, 1961
Guido L. Luzzatto, Le succés des Carraches et de l'école Bolonaise in "Gazette des beaux-arts" n. 103, pp. 85–92, 1961
Stephen Pepper, Annibale Carracci ritrattista in "Arte illustrata" n. 6, pp. 127–137, 1973
Carlo Volpe, Sugli inizi di Ludovico Carracci in "Paragone" n.317/319, pp. 115–129, 1976
Silvana Macchioni, Annibale Carracci, Ercole al bivio: dalla volta del Camerino Farnese alla Galleria Nazionale di Capodimonte. Genesi e interpretazioni in "Storia dell'arte" n. 41/43, pp. 151–170, 1981
Roberto Zapperi, Per la datazione degli affreschi della Galleria Farnese in Mélanges de l'École française de Rome n. °93, pp. 821–822, 1981
Diane de Grazia, The influence of Parmigianino on the drawings of Agostino and Annibale Carracci in Le arti a Bologna e in Emilia dal XVI al XVII secolo a cura di Andrea Emiliani, pp. 141–150, 1982
Luigi Spezzaferro, I Carracci tra Naturalismo e Classicismo in Le arti a Bologna e in Emilia dal XVI al XVII secolo, pp. 203–228, 1982
Luigi Grassi, I luoghi determinanti nella vicenda critica dei Carracci e i disegni relativi al fregio di Palazzo Magnani in Studi in onore di Giulio Carlo Argan, pp. 207–218, 1984
Eugenio Riccòmini, I Carracci in Storia illustrata di Bologna a cura di Walter Tega, pp. 201–220, 1989
Charles Dempsey, Gli studi sui Carracci: lo stato della questione in "Arte a Bologna" n. 1, p. 21–31, 1991
Andrea Emiliani, Gli esordi dei Carracci in La pittura in Emilia e in Romagna. Il Seicento pp. 77–112, 1992
Ann Sutherland Harris, Ludovico, Agostino, Annibale: "... l'abbiam fatta tutti noi" in "Atti e memorie dell'Accademia Clementina" n. 33/34, pp. 69–84, 1995
Charles Dempsey, Annibale Carracci in L'idea del bello: viaggio per Roma nel Seicento con Giovan Pietro Bellori catalogo della mostra a cura di Evelina Borea e Carlo Gasparri pp. 199–211, Roma 2000
Ann Sutherland Harris, Agostino Carracci in L'idea del bello... pp. 212–228, Roma 2000
Charles Dempsey, I Carracci a Palazzo Farnese in L'idea del bello... pp. 229–257, Roma 2000
Silvia Ginzburg, Sulla datazione e sul significato degli affreschi della Galleria Farnese in Studi di storia dell'arte in onore di Denis Mahon a cura di M. G. Bernardini, S. Danesi Squarzina e C. Strinati, pp. 95–108, 2000L'arte in Emilia e in Romagna: da Correggio a Morandi'' catalogo della mostra a cura di Andrea Emiliani e Michela Scolaro, pp.

Painters from Bologna
Trios
16th-century Italian painters
Italian male painters
Catholic painters